The Shanghai Yue Opera Group is a theatre in Shanghai, China, founded in 1950 and dedicated to Yue opera.

The Shanghai troupe is one of the more famous Yueju troupes (越剧剧团 Yueju jutuan).

References

1950 establishments in China
Buildings and structures in Shanghai
Theatre companies in Shanghai
Tourist attractions in Shanghai
Yue opera troupes